According to the Constitution of Trinidad and Tobago, the supreme law of the nation, the Attorney General and Minister of Legal Affairs of Trinidad and Tobago is the primary legal advisor to the Government of Trinidad and Tobago.

Roles and function
The Attorney General is a member of the Government and has two separate constitutional roles, a governmental role, in which he acts as a Member of Government in the performance of his duties, and a role as the guardian of the public interest, when he acts independently in a quasi-judicial capacity.

The provisions of the Constitution of the Republic of Trinidad and Tobago require the Attorney General to be responsible for the administration of legal affairs within the country. Legal proceedings for and against the State must be taken in the name of the Attorney General (in the case of civil proceedings) and in the name of the State (in the case of criminal proceedings).

The Attorney General has responsibility for the following departments:
Wholly Owned Enterprises
Appointment to Quasi Judicial Bodies
Law Reform
Office of the Solicitor General
Civil Litigation
Legal Advice to the Government
Office of Chief State Solicitor
Administrator General
Provisional Liquidator
Provisional Receiver
Public Trustee/Official Receiver
Office of Chief Parliamentary Counsel
Legislative Drafting
Statutory Boards and other Bodies
Corruption Investigation Bureau
Anti-Corruption Squad
Council of Legal Education
Environmental Commission
Equal Opportunity Commission
Equal Opportunity Tribunal
Hugh Wooding Law School
Industrial Court
Law Reform Commission
Tax Appeal Board

List of attorneys-general
 Trinidad only
Gloster c.1805 
H. Fuller c.1828
Wylie c.1832 (acting)
Edward Jackson, c.1840 (died 1846)
Charles William Warner, 1844 to 1870
George Garcia, 1870 to 1873 
Henry Ludlow, 1874 to 1886 
Stephen Herbert Gatty, 1886 to 1889
Trinidad united with Tobago, 1889
Stephen Herbert Gatty, 1889 to ?1892
George Lewis Garcia, 1892 to ?
Vincent Brown, 1903 to ? 
Henry Gollan, 1911 to 1918
Robert Stewart Aucher Warner, 1918 to ?1922
Sir Atholl MacGregor, 1926 to 1929
Charles Wilton Wood Greenidge c.1930
Sir Justin Louis Devaux 1935–1940
Wilcox Wilson c.1945
Joseph Leon Mathieu-Perez, c.1950 to 1957
Sir Ellis Clarke, 1957 to 1961
Trinidad and Tobago became independent, 1962
George Armsby Richards, 1962 to 1969
Karl Terrence Hudson-Phillips, 1969 to 1973  
Benjamin Llewellyn Basil Pitt, 1973 to 1976
Selwyn A. Richardson, 1976 to 1981
Russell Martineau, 1981 to 1986 
Selwyn A. Richardson, 1986 to 1989
Anthony Smart, 1989 to 1991 
Keith Sobion, 1991 to 1995
Kamla Persad-Bissessar, Nov. 1995 to Feb. 1996
Ramesh Lawrence Maharaj, Feb. 1996 to Oct. 2001
Kamla Persad-Bissessar, Oct. 2001 to Dec. 2001
Glenda Morean-Phillip, Dec. 2001 to Nov. 2003
John Jeremie, 2003 to 2007
Bridgid Annisette-George, 2007 to 2009
John Jeremie, May, 2009 to 2010
Anand Ramlogan, 2010 to 2015
Garvin Nicholas, 3 February 2015 to 9 September 2015
Faris Al-Rawi, 9 September 2015 to 16 March 2022
Reginald Armour, 16 March 2022 to present

See also

 Justice ministry
 Politics of Trinidad and Tobago

References

Government of Trinidad and Tobago
 
Justice ministries